Diallang Jaiyesimi (born 7 May 1998) is an English professional footballer who plays as a winger for EFL League Two side AFC Wimbledon on loan from Charlton Athletic.

At the age of 14, Jaiyesimi started his career with the Aspire Academy, later playing for Dulwich Hamlet, which he captained the U18s. Having been on trial with Norwich City, he then signed his first professional contract with the club in January 2016, playing in their U23's team, before taking the opportunity of a season long loan with Grimsby Town in League Two.

Club career

Early career
He came through the Aspire Academy run by Dulwich Hamlet, having joined at the age of 14. He was captain of the Dulwich Hamlet Under-18s, and also made five first team appearances, making his debut in a 2–0 victory in the Alan Turvey Trophy over Thamesmead Town in August 2015.

Norwich City
Jaiyesimi was scouted by professional clubs, he played four times on trial with Norwich's U18s and featured in wins over Leicester City Academy and West Ham United Academy, scoring against Arsenal Academy in November. In January 2016, he signed two-and-a-half-year contract with the Norwich City. During the 2016–17 season, Jaiyesimi made three appearances coming off the bench in the Football League Trophy, as part of the Norwich City Under-23s team. Jaiyesimi was Norwich City Under 23's joint top scorer that season with 8 goals in 33 appearances, finding the net against Wolves, Aston Villa, Everton, Fulham and Newcastle United U23s.

Loan to Grimsby Town
Jaiyesimi went on loan for the 2017–18 season on 9 August 2017 to League Two side Grimsby Town. He made his professional debut with Grimsby on 12 August 2017, in their 2–0 defeat at home to Coventry City, coming on as a 72nd-minute substitute.

Loan to Yeovil Town
On 20 June 2018, Jaiyesimi agreed to join League Two side Yeovil Town on loan until the end of the 2018–19 season. In October 2018, Jaiyesimi was ruled out for the remainder of the 2018–19 season with a serious knee injury, and returned to his parent club during the January transfer window.

Loan to Swindon Town
On 2 August 2019 he moved on loan to Swindon Town.

Swindon Town
Following his release from Norwich at the end of the 2019–20 season, Jaiyesimi re-joined Swindon Town on a permanent three-year deal on 27 July 2020.

Charlton Athletic
On 1 February 2021, Jaiyesimi joined League One side Charlton Athletic on a three-and-a-half-year deal for an undisclosed fee. He scored his first goal for Charlton in a 2–2 draw with AFC Wimbledon on 20 March 2021.

Loan to AFC Wimbledon
On 31 January 2023, Jaiyesimi joined AFC Wimbledon on loan until the end of the 2022–23 season. He scored his first goal for Wimbledon on 18 February 2023 in a 2-2 draw with Hartlepool United.

International career
Despite being born in England, Jaiyesimi was selected for Nigeria U20, Team Nigeria UK boss said: "Jaiyesimi is a Nigerian and he has been approached to play for Nigeria, he is available to play for Nigeria if called upon."

Style of play
Jaiyesimi is athletic, powerful with a physical presence, really fast, he can play on the left or right and can play the number 10 position.

Jaiyesimi can play as a winger, striker or as an attacking midfielder.

Career statistics

Honours
Swindon Town
EFL League Two: 2019–20

Personal life
Jaiyesimi is eligible to play for Nigeria, as he is of Nigerian descent.

References

1998 births
Living people
Footballers from Southwark
English people of Nigerian descent
Black British sportspeople
English footballers
Association football wingers
English Football League players
Norwich City F.C. players
Grimsby Town F.C. players
Dulwich Hamlet F.C. players
Yeovil Town F.C. players
Swindon Town F.C. players
Charlton Athletic F.C. players
AFC Wimbledon players